Calvatia cyathiformis, or purple-spored puffball, is a large edible saprobic species of Calvatia. This terrestrial puffball has purplish or purple-brown spores, which distinguish it from other large Agaricales. It is found mostly in prairie or grasslands of North America, Australia, and probably elsewhere.

Description

When young it is relatively smooth and spherical or slightly flattened and purplish or brownish. It has a chocolate-brown or purple-colored gleba with a smooth exoperidium. As it matures it often becomes pear or irregularly-shaped and the exterior skin takes on a dark or silvery colour. As it ages the exterior dries and cracks and the fleshy spore-bearing interior breaks away to be distributed by wind and rain. After the spores completely disperse, "a soft leathery cup-shaped sterile base lightly rooted to the ground remains".

According to MushroomExpert.Com, the spores are "3.5–7.5 µ; round, spiny or warty to nearly smooth. Capillitial threads 3–7.5 µ wide; thick-walled; minutely pitted."

The spore mass turns from white to yellow to dull purple or purple-brown at maturity. It is said to be edible until the flesh begins to turn to a tan colour.

To make a meal from most mushrooms, you probably hope to find at least a half dozen to a dozen, depending on the size. The large Calvatia species are special, because one or two at the most will probably be sufficient for a dinner for two. While this puffball does not have a strong flavor of its own, it is still quite good, and its ability to absorb flavors makes it a rewarding find.Lycoperdon utriforme is a similar species.

Distribution in Australia
This is a common puffball in grazing paddocks and grassed areas around the wet areas of Australia in the southwest of Western Australia, and from Adelaide in South Australia to Cooktown, on Cape York Peninsula, as well as in Darwin, Northern Territory.

Footnotes

References
 Hall, Ian, et al. (2003). Edible and Poisonous Mushrooms of the World. Timber Press. .

External links
 Calvatia cyathiformis at Mushroomobserver.org.

Agaricaceae
Edible fungi
Fungi of North America
Fungi of Australia
Fungi of Africa